Eckartsberga is a town in the Burgenlandkreis district of Saxony-Anhalt, Germany. It is situated west of Naumburg. It is part of the Verbandsgemeinde ("collective municipality") An der Finne. Since 2009 it has included the former municipalities of Burgholzhausen and Tromsdorf.

People
 Ludwig Abel (1835-1895), violinist and composer
 Klaus Agthe (born 1930), businessman and author
 Peter Frenkel (born 1939), athlete
 Rolf Friedemann Pauls (1915-2002), diplomat
 Ferdinand Rudow (1840-1920), entomologist

References

Burgenlandkreis